Harold Shipman: Doctor Death is a 2002 ITV television drama about the life and crimes of serial killer Harold Shipman. Starring James Bolam in the role of Shipman, the programme was directed by Roger Bamford and written by Michael Eaton. It was broadcast on 9 July 2002, and attracted a viewing audience of 7.37 million. The programme was released on DVD on 15 July 2013 by Strawberry Media, in association with ITV.

Cast
 James Bolam as Harold Shipman
 James Hazeldine as Detective Inspector Stan Egerton
 Jacqueline Pilton as Primrose Shipman
 Olive Pendleton as Kathleen Grundy
 Deborah Norton as Debra King
 Peter Gunn as Detective Sergeant John Ashley
 Peter Penry-Jones as Dr. John Rutherford
 Gareth Thomas as Reverend Dennis Thomas
 Tony Melody as Len Fellows
 Alan Rothwell as Alan Massey
 John Flanagan as Jim King
 Clare Kerrigan as Julie Watkins
 Colin Meredith as Brian Burgess
 Demelza Randall as Debbie Bambroffe
 Michael Stainton as John Shaw
 Veda Warwick as May Clarke
Mary MacLeod as Ivy Lomas
 Ken Kitson as Inspector Dave Smith
 Jonathan Coy as Detective Chief Superintendent Bernard Postles
 Marcus Romer as Detective Constable Ellis Crowther
 Paul Slack as Detective Sergeant John Walker
 Siobhan Finneran as Kathleen Adanski
 Monica Dolan as Police Officer (uncredited)

See also
Ben Geen, British nurse who was found to have murdered two patients and committed grievous bodily harm to 15 others

References

External links
 .

2002 British television series debuts
2002 British television series endings
British crime drama television series
British serial killer films
2002 television films
2002 films
British television films
British biographical films
English-language television shows
ITV television dramas
Television series by ITV Studios
Television series by Yorkshire Television
Television series set in the 1990s
Television shows set in Greater Manchester
True crime television series
Cultural depictions of male serial killers
Cultural depictions of British men
2000s English-language films
2000s British films